Klevenville is an unincorporated community located in the town of Springdale, Dane County, Wisconsin, United States.

History
A post office called Klevenville was established in 1891, and remained in operation until it was discontinued in 1952. The community was named for Iver Kleven, a pioneer settler.

Notes

Unincorporated communities in Dane County, Wisconsin
Unincorporated communities in Wisconsin